The Wolfville Formation is a Triassic geologic formation of Nova Scotia. The formation is of Carnian to early Norian age. Fossils of small land vertebrates have been found in the formation, including procolophonid and early archosauromorph reptiles and cynodonts. Dinosaur remains are among the fossils that have been recovered from the formation, although none have yet been referred to a specific genus.

Vertebrate fauna

Synapsids

Archosauromorphs

Procolophonids

See also 
 List of dinosaur-bearing rock formations
 List of stratigraphic units with indeterminate dinosaur fossils

References

Bibliography 
  

Geologic formations of Canada
Triassic System of North America
Carnian Stage
Paleontology in Nova Scotia